Maksim Nikolayevich Tokarev (born 7 October 1981) is a Russian professional football official and a former player. He works as a team director for FC Akron Tolyatti.

Club career
He played 5 seasons in the Russian Football National League for FC Lada Togliatti and FC KAMAZ Naberezhnye Chelny.

References

External links
 

1981 births
Sportspeople from Tolyatti
Living people
Russian footballers
Association football midfielders
FC Lada-Tolyatti players
FC Sodovik Sterlitamak players
FC KAMAZ Naberezhnye Chelny players
FC Gornyak Uchaly players
FC Nosta Novotroitsk players